Scolia dubia, also known as the two-spotted scoliid wasp or a blue-winged scoliid wasp, is a  long wasp that ranges from New England to Florida and west to the Rocky Mountains in North America. The head, thorax, and first two abdominal segments are black, while the remainder of the abdomen is red with two bright yellow spots on the third abdominal segment. The distal section of the blue-black wings has longitudinal wrinkles.  These wasps collect nectar from flowers in late summer and early fall.

Females burrow into ground in search of grubs, particularly those of the green June beetle, Cotinis nitida, and some research suggests, possibly the Japanese beetle, Popillia japonica. The wasp stings the grub and frequently burrows farther down to construct a cell and lay an egg on the host. The larva pupates and overwinters inside the body of the host.

Males of this species have been observed taking part in large mating flights from mid-August to early September in Virginia.  Males have longer antennae than females do.

References

External links
Blue-winged wasp eating nectar in flowers

Scoliidae
Hymenoptera of North America
Insects described in 1837